Kouniakary or Koniakari is a town and urban commune in the Cercle of Kayes in the Kayes Region of south-western Mali. The town is located approximately 65 kilometres from Kayes city. In 2009 the commune had a population of 8135.

In 1855, El Hadj Umar Tall constructed a tata (fortification) at Koniakari to protect against the soldiers of French Colonel Louis Archinard; the tata still stands today, and has become a tourist attraction.

References
This article began as a translation of the corresponding article from the French Wikipedia, accessed December 17, 2005.

Communes of Kayes Region
French West Africa